The Democratic Socialists of America (DSA) is a multi-tendency, democratic-socialist, and labor-oriented political organization in the United States. Its roots are in the Socialist Party of America (SPA), whose leaders included Eugene V. Debs, Norman Thomas and Michael Harrington. In 1973, Harrington, the leader of a minority faction that had opposed the SPA's transformation into the Social Democrats, USA (SDUSA) during the party's 1972 national convention, formed the Democratic Socialist Organizing Committee (DSOC). In 1982, it merged with the New American Movement (NAM), a coalition of intellectuals with roots in the New Left movements of the 1960s and former members of socialist and communist parties of the Old Left. Upon the founding of the DSA, Harrington and the socialist feminist author Barbara Ehrenreich were elected as co-chairs of the organization.

The DSOC, which Harrington described as "the remnant of a remnant", and, later, the DSA soon became the largest democratic-socialist organisation in the United States. Initially, the organization consisted of approximately 5,000 ex-DSOC members and 1,000 ex-NAM members. As of July 2021, the membership of the organization was reported at over 94,000 and the number of local chapters was 239. The organization is credited with the rise of millennial socialism. In December 2017, the median age of its membership was 33, compared to 68 in 2013. 

The DSA has a stated goal of "[participating in] fights for reforms today that will weaken the power of corporations and increase the power of working people." To achieve this goal, the organization has endorsed Democratic presidential candidates, including Walter Mondale, Jesse Jackson, John Kerry, Barack Obama and Bernie Sanders, as well as Green Party candidate Ralph Nader and other third party candidates.

Though not a political party in the conventional American understanding of the term, members of the DSA have run in elections and have been elected. Some long-time Democratic members of the United States House of Representatives, including John Conyers, Ron Dellums, David Bonior and Major Owens, have been affiliated to the DSA. More recently, the number of DSA Representatives and other office holders has been increasing. In November 2018, Alexandria Ocasio-Cortez and Rashida Tlaib were elected to the House. In November 2020, Ocasio-Cortez and Tlaib were re-elected to the House, and were joined by two more DSA members, Cori Bush and Jamaal Bowman. In November 2022, Greg Casar was the fifth DSA member jointly elected to the House. At the same time, 50 state lawmakers were affiliated to the DSA.

History

Early history and leadership

Formed in 1982 by the merger of the Democratic Socialist Organizing Committee (DSOC) and the New American Movement (NAM), the DSA is a 501(c)(4) nonprofit organization. At its founding, it was said to consist of approximately 5,000 members from the DSOC, plus 1,000 from the NAM. Dorothy Ray Healey served as Vice Chair in 1982.

The DSA inherited both Old Left and New Left heritage. The NAM was a successor to the disintegrated Students for a Democratic Society. The DSOC was founded in 1973 from a minority anti-Vietnam War caucus in the Socialist Party of America (SPA)—which had been renamed Social Democrats, USA (SDUSA). DSOC started with 840 members, of whom 2% had served on its national board, and approximately 200 of whom came from SDUSA or its predecessors (the Socialist Party–Social Democratic Federation, formerly part of the SPA) in 1973, when the SDUSA stated its membership at 1,800 according to a 1973 profile of Harrington.

The red rose is part of the official logo of the DSA, having traditionally been a symbol of socialism since the 1886 Haymarket Affair and the resulting May Day marches from the 19th century to the current day. It was drawn from the logo of the DSOC, its precursor organization, and previously of the Socialist International, which shows a stylized fist clenching a red rose, the fist being substituted with a biracial handshake pertaining to the DSA's staunch anti-racism. The fist and rose logo had been originally designed for the French Socialist Party in 1969 and was later shared by socialist and labor political organizations worldwide.

Electoral politics and office-holding members

In electoral politics, the DSA was very strongly associated with Michael Harrington's position that "the left wing of realism is found today in the Democratic Party". In its early years, the DSA opposed Republican presidential candidates by giving critical support to Democratic Party nominees like Walter Mondale in 1984. In 1988, the DSA enthusiastically supported Jesse Jackson's second presidential campaign. Since 1995, the DSA's position on American electoral politics has been that "democratic socialists reject an either-or approach to electoral coalition building, focused solely on a new party or on realignment within the Democratic Party". During the 1990s, the DSA gave the Clinton administration an overall rating of C−, "less than satisfactory".

The DSA's elected leadership has often seen working within the Democratic Party as necessary rather than forming or support third parties. That said, the DSA is very critical of the Democratic Party leadership, which the DSA argues is corporate-funded. The organization has stated:

Presidential elections
In 2000, the DSA took no official position on the presidential election, with several prominent DSA members backing Green Party presidential candidate Ralph Nader while others supported Socialist Party USA candidate David McReynolds and others voting for Democratic nominee Al Gore.

In 2004, the organization backed John Kerry after he won the Democratic nomination. In its official magazine, the DSA's Political Action Committee said that a defeat for Kerry would be taken as a defeat of the mainstream left, but that "On the other hand, a Kerry victory will let us press onward, with progressives aggressively pressuring an administration that owed its victory to democratic mobilization from below." The only resolution on upcoming elections at the DSA's 2005 convention focused on Bernie Sanders's independent campaign for the Senate in Vermont. The organization's 2007 convention in Atlanta featured record-breaking attendance and more participation by the organization's youth wing. Sanders gave the keynote address.

In 2008, the DSA supported Democratic presidential candidate Barack Obama in his race against Republican candidate John McCain. In an article written in the March 24 edition of The Nation, DSA members Barbara Ehrenreich and Bill Fletcher Jr., along with Tom Hayden and Danny Glover, announced the formation of Progressives for Obama, arguing that Obama was the most progressive viable Democratic presidential candidate since Robert F. Kennedy in 1968.

Following Obama's election, many on the political right began to allege that his administration's policies were "socialistic", a claim rejected by the DSA and the Obama administration alike. The claim led DSA National Director Frank Llewellyn to declare that "over the past 12 months, the Democratic Socialists of America has received more media attention than it has over the past 12 years".

For the 2016 presidential election, the DSA endorsed Sanders as its favored presidential candidate. Sanders' candidacy prompted a surge in DSA membership among young voters. The DSA made it clear that Sanders' New Deal-inspired program did not fulfill the socialist aim of establishing social ownership of the economy, but considered his campaign to be a positive development in the context of contemporary American politics, since he was a self-identified democratic socialist candidate as well as "a lifelong champion of the public programs and democratic rights that empower working class people". The DSA ran the internally-focused #WeNeedBernie campaign to mobilize DSA supporters for Sanders. After Sanders' defeat in the 2016 Democratic primaries, the DSA called for the defeat of Donald Trump, but did not officially endorse Democratic nominee Hillary Clinton.

In 2020, the DSA endorsed Bernie Sanders after an advisory poll reported 76% of the participating membership approved his endorsement, despite there being objections from a part of the DSA membership concerning statements by Sanders on, among others, slavery reparations. No other candidates were included in the poll. After Sanders dropped out in April 2020, the DSA explicitly did not endorse the presumptive nominee Joe Biden. Two DSA chapters (Colorado Springs and Salt Lake City) voted to endorse Green Party candidate Howie Hawkins.

In May 2020, the failure of the DSA to endorse Biden was criticised by 91 "founders, officers and activists" of the Students for a Democratic Society (SDS) in the 1960s in an open letter "to the New New Left From the Old New Left" published in The Nation. Daniel Finn (on Jacobin) responded that in invoking the specter of fascism under a second-term Trump, the former SDSers are engaging in "melodramatic hyperbole" and, on that climate change is not an issue that can wait until 2024 or 2028. "No socialist", he argued, "who campaigned for Bernie Sanders should feel guilty about abandoning [the Democrats] and concentrating on building a movement that is the only real hope for the planet’s future".

Congress and other races
In the United States elections of 2017, the DSA endorsed fifteen candidates for office, with the highest position gained being that of Lee J. Carter in the Virginia House of Delegates. DSA members won 15 electoral offices in thirteen states, bringing the total to thirty-five (the DSA, having changed its electoral strategy at its national convention, had anticipated picking up approximately five seats): city council seats in Pleasant Hill, Iowa (Ross Grooters), Billings, Montana (Denise Joy), Knoxville, Tennessee (Seema Singh Perez), Duluth, Minnesota (Joel Sipress) and Somerville, Massachusetts (JT Scott and Ben Ewen-Campen); and the seat in the Virginia House of Delegates contested by Carter, among other offices. 56% of the DSA members who ran in this election cycle won compared to the 20% previously in 2016. These results encouraged dozens more DSA members to run for office in the 2018 midterm elections.

In the 2018 midterm elections, the DSA had anticipated seeing the first DSA member in Congress and reaching 100 elected officials nationwide from its strategic down-ballot campaigns. 42 formally endorsed people were running for offices at the federal, state and local levels in 20 states, including Florida, Hawaii, Kansas and Michigan; Maine's Zak Ringelstein, a Democrat, was its sole senatorial candidate. Local chapters have endorsed 110 candidates. Four female DSA members (Sara Innamorato, Summer Lee, Elizabeth Fiedler and Kristin Seale) won Democratic primary contests for seats in the Pennsylvania House of Representatives, with Innamorato and Lee defeating incumbents. Additionally, Jade Bahr and Amelia Marquez won their primaries in Montana for the State House and Jeremy Mele won his primary for the Maine House of Representatives. In California, Jovanka Beckles won one of the top two spots in the primary and advanced to the general election for a State Assembly seat in the East Bay.

On June 26, DSA member and endorsee Alexandria Ocasio-Cortez won the Democratic primary against incumbent Representative Joseph Crowley in New York's 14th congressional district in a surprise upset, virtually guaranteeing her the congressional seat in the heavily Democratic district which spans parts of the Bronx and Queens.  Minority Leader Nancy Pelosi, however, dismissed the win as "not to be viewed as something that stands for anything else" and argued that it only represented change in one progressive district. Conversely, head of the Democratic National Committee Tom Perez proclaimed her to be "the future of our party" whereas the Trotskyist International Committee of the Fourth International critiqued her and the DSA as being a "left" cover for the "right-wing Democratic Party", particularly in regard to foreign policy. Six weeks after Ocasio-Cortez's primary victory, DSA member and endorsee Rashida Tlaib won the Democratic primary in Michigan's 13th congressional district. Both Ocasio-Cortez and Tlaib went on to win their respective general elections to become members of Congress. Ultimately, about a dozen members (or non-members who were endorsed) won office in their state legislatures. In the aggregate, the DSA had backed 40 winning candidates at the state, county and municipal levels.

Ocasio-Cortez's victory and the subsequent publicity for the DSA led to more than 1,000 new members joining the organization the next day, approximately 35 times the daily average and their largest ever one-day increase in membership. These signups helped boost the organization to 42,000 members nationally in June 2018. That number increased to 50,000 by September 1, 2018.

DSA members elected to Congress in 2018 include Ocasio-Cortez, Tlaib and incumbent Danny K. Davis.  DSA members elected to state legislatures in 2018 include Hawaii Representative Amy Perruso, New York Senator Julia Salazar, and Pennsylvania Representatives Fiedler, Innamorato, and Lee.

The 2019 Chicago aldermanic elections saw six DSA members elected to the 50-seat Chicago City Council: incumbent Carlos Ramirez-Rosa as well as newcomers Daniel La Spata, Jeanette Taylor, Byron Sigcho-Lopez, Rossana Rodriguez-Sanchez, and Andre Vasquez. In the 2019 off-year elections, DSA members made further gains by capturing over a half dozen city council seats across the country, such as Dean Preston becoming the first democratic socialist elected to the San Francisco Board of Supervisors in forty years, while Lee Carter won reelection in the Virginia House of Delegates.

In the 2020 elections, at least thirty-six DSA members won office, earning more than 3.1 million votes.

The DSA elected four of its members to the US House of Representatives, including incumbents Alexandria Ocasio-Cortez (NY-14) and Rashida Tlaib (MI-13) and newly elected members Jamaal Bowman (NY-16) and Cori Bush (MO-1). DSA members were unsuccessful in being elected to the House in West Virginia (WV-2), Mississippi (MS-1) and California (CA-12).

In Tennessee, Marquita Bradshaw won the Democratic nomination for the 2020 Senate election in an upset. Initially not nationally endorsed, she was endorsed by the Memphis-Midsouth chapter of DSA and after her victory in the primary she was also endorsed by the other Tennessee DSA chapters in Knoxville, Chattanooga, Middle and Northeast Tennessee. She lost the general election against Bill Hagerty.

State and local offices 
In 2020, the DSA made significant gains in the state legislatures. Over thirty DSA members and endorsed (either nationally or by local chapters) candidates were elected in sixteen states, including five in Pennsylvania and seven in New York. Notable victories were in West Philadelphia, where Rick Krajewski beat the incumbent of 35 years and in New York City where an entire slate of five candidates was (re-)elected to the state house and the state senate. All DSA incumbents were re-elected, with the sole exception being Jade Bahr who lost her race for the Montana House of Representatives.

Dozens of DSA members and affiliated candidates won their races for local offices. Most notably Nithya Raman, endorsed by the national DSA, won her race for Los Angeles city council in district 4 and Janeese Lewis George won her race for Washington, D.C. city council ward 4, after winning her primary against incumbent Brandon Todd. Dean Preston was re-elected to the San Francisco Board of Supervisors. José Garza was elected as district attorney for Travis County in Texas and Gabriella Cázares-Kelly was elected county recorder in Pima County, Arizona Other DSA affiliated candidates were elected to city councils in Austin, Aurora, Oakland, Burbank, Berkeley, Mountain View, South San Francisco, Redwood City, Sacramento, Burlington, Madison, Stoughton, St. Petersburg and Portland (Maine).

2021 Nevada Democratic Party elections
In March 2021, an all-DSA leadership of a state Democratic party was elected for the first time in its history, sweeping the leadership of the Nevada Democratic Party.

2021 Buffalo, New York mayoral election 
In June 2021, the Buffalo, New York chapter-endorsed candidate, India Walton, won the Democratic Party primary election for mayor, defeating incumbent Byron Brown. Following the primary election loss, Brown qualified for the general election as a write-in candidate. In November 2021 Walton lost the mayoral race to Byron Brown, who earned 38,338 write-in votes compared to Walton's 25,773 votes.

Membership 

In the early 1980s, the estimated membership of the DSOC was 5,000, but after its merger with the NAM the membership of the organization grew to an estimated 7,000 in 1987. In 2002, Fox News said there were 8,000 members in the DSA.

Following the election of Donald Trump as president, the DSA experienced a rapid expansion of its paid membership. In 2017, the organization passed a resolution calling for the national office to provide the group's paid members with a copy of a financial report in non-convention years. A first such report covering the whole of 2017 and the first half of 2018 was published in August 2018.

Once the coronavirus pandemic arrived in America, the DSA saw another expansion in membership. In May 2020, organizers claimed that the DSA attracted about 10,000 new members since March. And according to DSA leaders, with Senator Bernie Sanders dropping out of the presidential race in April, leftists who were previously aligned with the Sanders campaign moved over to the DSA.

As of November 2020, the organization claimed over 85,000 members, and according to its financial report before its 2021 convention, the DSA now claims 94,915 members, with at least a dozen DSA members in every congressional district.

Structure

National Political Committee
Governance of the DSA is by the group's National Political Committee (NPC), which since 2001 has been a 16-person body. The DSA's constitution states that at least eight of the NPC's members shall be women and at least four members of "racial or national" minority groups. A 17th vote is cast by the representative of the DSA's youth affiliate who elects one male and one female delegate who split the vote. The NPC meets four times a year.

The NPC elects an inner committee of six, including five of its own members and one representative of the youth section, called the Steering Committee. At least two of these are constitutionally required to be women and at least one person of color, with the National Director and the Youth Section Organizer also participating as ex officio members. This Steering Committee meets bi-monthly, either in person or by conference call.

The DSA is organized at the local level with guidance from the NPC and works with labor unions, community organizations and campus activists on issues of common interest. Nationwide campaigns are coordinated by the organization's national office in New York City. , the DSA lists 238 chapters and organizing committees in all 50 states.

Student section 

The Young Democratic Socialists of America (YDSA) is the official student section of the DSA. The YDSA chapters and members are encouraged to pursue and promote a democratic socialist political education and participate in social justice activism, often taking part in anti-war, labor and student-issue marches and rallies. The YDSA publishes a newsletter called The Red Letter and a blog titled The Activist. The organization's national activities revolve around supporting the DSA campaigns and initiatives and organizing various student conferences, usually held in New York City. The YDSA is a full member of the International Union of Socialist Youth (IUSY).

The YDSA expanded following youth support for Bernie Sanders' 2016 presidential candidacy. According to a YDSA organizer, the group expanded from 25 to 84 registered chapters between 2016 and 2019.

National conventions 
Biennial national conventions represent the highest authority of the DSA and help guide it and its policies. Conventions are held every odd-numbered year.

Publications 
The DSA publishes Democratic Left, a quarterly magazine of news and analysis. This publication continues in an uninterrupted run from the original Newsletter of the Democratic Left published by the DSOC (the DSA forerunner) since its establishment in 1973. In 2008, DSA members active in the American labor movement founded Talking Union, a blog that focuses on labor politics, working-class struggles and strategies.

Left-wing quarterly magazine Jacobin is considered to be very close to the organization, although there is no official affiliation between the magazine and DSA. In 2014 its founder and then-editor Bhaskar Sunkara, who is a DSA member, said that Michael Harrington was “very underrated as a popularizer of Marxist thought".

Policy and ideology

Tendencies within the DSA
DSA members have views ranging across the spectrum from democratic socialism to progressivism, social democracy, eco-socialism, libertarian socialism, Bill of Rights socialism, and communism.

Socialism 
The DSA regards the abolition of capitalism and the realization of socialism as a gradual long-term goal, therefore the organization focuses its immediate political energies on reforms within capitalism that empower working people while decreasing the power of corporations.

The DSA characterizes its vision of socialism as an economic system based on maximum decentralization that can be supportive of a range of models for social ownership, including publicly owned enterprises and worker-owned cooperatives. The DSA rejects centralized economic planning in favor of a combination of democratic planning and market mechanisms: because the DSA does not believe capitalism and private corporations can be immediately replaced with socialism, it is favorable to using government regulations and organized labor to make private businesses more accountable to the public interest.

Social democracy and the welfare state
One older leaflet detailing the group's official ideas, "What is Democratic Socialism? Questions and Answers from the Democratic Socialists of America", states that "no country has fully instituted democratic socialism". Nonetheless, according to the DSA there are lessons to be learned from "the comprehensive welfare state maintained by the Swedes, from Canada's national healthcare system, France's nationwide childcare program, and Nicaragua's literacy programs". The "tremendous prosperity and relative economic equality" established by the social democratic parties of the countries of Scandinavia and parts of Western Europe are lauded.

Foreign affairs

In 2016, the DSA issued a statement of solidarity with Venezuela. The statement called the sanctions placed on Venezuela by the Obama administration unjust and illegal. It called for the United States to cease its interference in Venezuelan affairs, saying: "We call on the President and Congress to reverse these actions and stop seeking to undermine the Venezuelan people and their legitimate, democratically elected government".

At the 2017 DSA Convention, the group announced its withdrawal from the Socialist International (SI). The resolution passed states that the DSA will "[build] direct relationships with socialist and left parties and social movements around the world that we can learn from and which share our values.... Our affiliation with the Socialist International hinders our ability to develop stronger relationships with parties and social movements that share our values and which, in many cases, are bitterly opposed to their country's SI affiliate(s)". This was viewed as the DSA voicing its opposition to the SI's perceived acceptance of "neoliberal economic policies".

At the 2017 convention it also passed a resolution which solidified the DSA's solidarity with the cause of the Palestinian people and with the controversial Boycott, Divestment, and Sanctions movement: "Democratic Socialists of America condemns all efforts to deny the right of Palestinians in the United States and their allies to free speech, assembly, and academic freedom". The resolution further condemned Israeli actions, comparing those actions to apartheid. The DSA has shown its solidarity with Ahed Tamimi. The statement also reiterated the DSA's support for the liberation of the Palestinian people.

The DSA opposes United States intervention in the Syrian Civil War. A statement issued in April 2017 called the intervention by the Trump administration a violation of both domestic and international law. In the same statement, the DSA called for protests of Trump's actions and for the lobbying of Congress to halt any further intervention.

At the 2019 DSA Convention, the group announced its support for open borders. At the 2021 DSA Convention, the organization's members voted to apply for membership in the São Paulo Forum, a conference of leftist political parties and organizations largely from Latin America and the Caribbean.

A DSA delegation travelled to Caracas, Venezuela, in June 2021 to meet with Nicolás Maduro and to attend the Bicentennial Congress of the Peoples, considered not an autonomous body, but rather "an assemblage of national and foreign supporters" of Maduro himself launched in an attempt "to coat itself with a veneer of international support". They were also criticized for giving "a bad name to the international left in Venezuela".

On February 26, 2022, the DSA issued a statement condemning Russia's invasion of Ukraine while arguing that the United States provoked Russia. The statement called for the United States to withdraw from NATO and "end the imperialist expansionism that set the stage for this conflict". This statement was criticized by Democratic congresspersons, as well as politicians who were affiliated with DSA. Critics described the DSA statement as "tone deaf". Others defended the statement and criticized the responses from mainstream media and politicians attacking the organization.

Anti-racism and anti-fascism 

Positioning itself as an anti-racist and anti-fascist organization, the DSA connects this fight against fascist groups to its broader struggle against capitalism, saying on its website: "We believe that the terror unleashed on our comrades can be defeated. We also believe that the wider system of racist oppression can be defeated, but only with the ending of the capitalist system which birthed it".

Members have been present at various anti-fascist marches and protests, including counterprotests against the Unite the Right rally in Charlottesville, Virginia, the Boston Free Speech Rally and many other right-wing rallies surrounding the removal of Confederate monuments and memorials. The DSA positions itself with other left-wing groups who fight fascism in the United States, including the Industrial Workers of the World and groups involved in the antifa movement. The organization also criticizes the police in the United States for their handling of anti-fascist activities and activities of such groups as Black Lives Matter.

The DSA believes in defending communities from neofascist violence and building a multi-racial working-class movement. This involves deplatforming reactionary and racist groups and events, believing that a united front of left-wing organizations needs to confront these forces wherever they appear.

Labor movement and workers' rights 
The DSA has long been a supporter and defender of the labor movement in the United States and has also argued for the increase of international worker solidarity. The DSA believes in a livable minimum wage for all workers, but it notes that this fight only goes so far and is only the first step in building a more humane economic system: "Ultimately the minimum wage only works for those lucky enough to find a job – even a low paying one – and it doesn't really "work" for them, because it doesn't come with health benefits, adequate schools, or enough money to set aside for retirement". The DSA members have been supporters and active participants in fights to increase the minimum wage across the country, including the Fight for $15 protests.

The DSA opposes right to work laws, which are seen as an attack on the rights of workers and the historic advances of the labor movement. It is argued that the enactment of these laws reduces the efficacy of collective bargaining agreements, putting workers at a disadvantage. In a statement released in 2014, the organization said: "Such "right to work" laws consciously aim to weaken union strength; they are the main reason why the "right to work" is, as Martin Luther King Jr. put it, "the right to work for less".

The DSA argues that financial elites have consciously fought to destroy union power in an effort to solidify the hegemony of markets and corporate power. The organization believes that for an equitable and sustainable economic system that the production of wealth should be under the democratic control of those who produce it. The DSA also emphasizes the role played by immigrants, women, disabled workers, LGBTQIA+ and workers of color in the broader labor movement, believing that all barriers between working people must be broken in order to help create and maintain a broad and unified labor movement.

LGBT+ rights 
The DSA is committed to the rights of the LGBT community, connecting anti-gay prejudice to capitalist exploitation. This includes pushes for equal rights and protections for all those who identify as LGBTQIA+ as well as rights to housing, jobs, education, public accommodations and healthcare. The DSA recognizes that those who are most discriminated against based on identity are disproportionately women and people of color. The organization also seeks to ensure public schools are safe places for LGBTQIA+ students and that students should have total access to facilities that reflect their gender. The DSA supports the protection of same-sex marriages, but it "views marriage as only a first step in recognizing the diversity of human relationships".

Feminism 
The DSA aligns itself with the socialist feminist movement. The organization holds that capitalism is built on white supremacy as well as male supremacy. The DSA maintains that reproductive rights are central to the feminist movement. Connecting democratic socialism and socialist feminism, the DSA says "that birth control and safe abortion should be provided as part of a comprehensive single-payer healthcare program". Believing that electoral politics can only take socialist feminism so far, the organization also says that the emphasis must be on community-based grassroots movements. The DSA further says that socialist feminism must include the rights of the LGBTQIA+ community.

Israeli–Palestinian conflict 

The DSA is opposed to Zionism and to the current form of the State of Israel. DSA views the current form of the State of Israel as imperialist and as a form of ethnostate. The DSA formerly supported Israel throughout much of its history, including socialist and progressive individuals and movements inside the state. In 2018, Jo-Ann Mort, former vice-chair of DSA, described the group as formerly having been "the place to go on the left if you were a socialist and you were pro-Israel".

On August 5, 2017, members of the organization passed a motion to formally endorse the Boycott, Divestment and Sanctions movement. Alternet noted that this has been a dividing issue, with older members trying to "reconcile socialism with Zionism", while younger members recognize the movement as a "time-tested means of nonviolent protest" and "the most powerful force to combat Israeli apartheid in the 21st century".

See also 
American Left
Socialist Party of America
Socialist Party USA
Movement for a People's Party
List of Democratic Socialists of America public officeholders

Notes

References

Further reading 
 Kate Aronoff (August 7, 2017). "Are the Democratic Socialists of America for Real?". The New Republic. Retrieved June 30, 2018.
 Joel Freedman (November–December 1981). "No Enemies on the Left as DSOC and NAM Merge". New America. New York. vol. 18. no. 6. p. 5.
Lauren Gambino (August 6, 2019) 'We're here to win': US democratic socialists move to center stage. The Guardian. Retrieved August 7, 2019
 Joel Meyerson, "What the Socialists Just Did — And Why," The American Prospect, August 9, 2019.
 Jennifer Swann (February 8, 2017). "How Democratic Socialists Are Building on Bernie's Momentum". Rolling Stone. Retrieved June 30, 2018.
 Marc Tracy, "Is 'Bernie or Bust' the Future of the Left?" New York Times, August 6, 2019. Print version: "Party on the Left Gets Bigger, Stronger and Declares 'Bernie or Bust.'" August 6, 2019, section A, pg. 11.
 "DSA Members Comment on Their 2017 Convention". Portside.org. August 24, 2017. Retrieved June 30, 2018.

External links 

 
 Constitution of the DSA. Dsausa.org. Retrieved July 14, 2021.
 Young Democratic Socialists official website (youth affiliate of DSA).
 January 2018 National Public Radio segment on the burgeoning interest in the DSA.
 July 2018 National Public Radio segment on the political impact of the DSA.
 Maria Svart's editorial in the New York Daily News following Alexandria Ocasio-Cortez's primary win.
 What We're Building. A methodological survey of DSA chapters.
 Pinkos Have More Fun : Socialism is AOC's calling card, Trump's latest rhetorical bludgeon, and a new way to date in Brooklyn New York article by Simon van Zuylen-Wood about socialism's sudden popularity, with a focus on DSA. (March 3, 2019)

 
1982 establishments in the United States
Organizations established in 1982
Socialist Party of America
Social Democrats, USA
Anti-fascist organizations in the United States
Anti-racist organizations in the United States
Democratic socialist organizations in the United States
Feminist organizations in the United States
Multi-tendency organizations in the United States
Progressive organizations in the United States
Social democratic organizations in the United States
Anti-Zionism in the United States
Socialism in the United States
Healthcare reform advocacy groups in the United States
501(c)(4) nonprofit organizations